Youssef Ali Omar (born 3 March 1928) is an Egyptian sprinter. He competed in the men's 100 metres at the 1952 Summer Olympics.

References

External links
 

1928 births
Possibly living people
Athletes (track and field) at the 1952 Summer Olympics
Egyptian male sprinters
Olympic athletes of Egypt
Place of birth missing (living people)